The Archbasilica Cathedral of the Most Holy Savior and of Saints John the Baptist and John the Evangelist in the Lateran, also known as the Papal Archbasilica of Saint John [in] Lateran, Saint John Lateran, or the Lateran Basilica, is the Catholic cathedral church of the Diocese of Rome in the city of Rome, and serves as the seat of the bishop of Rome, the pope. Nevertheless, as properties of the Holy See, the archbasilica and its adjoining edifices enjoy an extraterritorial status from Italy, pursuant to the terms of the Lateran Treaty of 1929. Laterano (Lateran) comes from an ancient Roman family (gens), whose palace (domus) grounds occupied the site; the Lateran Palace was the primary residence of the pope until the Middle Ages.

The church is the oldest and highest ranking of the four major papal basilicas as well as one of the Seven Pilgrim Churches of Rome, holding the unique title of "archbasilica". Founded in 324, it is the oldest public church in the city of Rome, and the oldest basilica of the Western world. It houses the cathedra of the Roman bishop, and has the title of ecumenical mother church of the Catholic faithful. The building deteriorated during the Middle Ages and was badly damaged by two fires in the 14th century. It was rebuilt in the late 16th century during the reign of Pope Sixtus V. The new structure's interior was renovated in the late 17th century, and its façade was completed in 1735 under Pope Clement XII.

The current rector is Cardinal Archpriest Angelo De Donatis, Vicar General for the Diocese of Rome. The president of the French Republic, currently Emmanuel Macron, is ex officio the "First and Only Honorary Canon" of the archbasilica, a title that the heads of state of France have possessed since King Henry IV.

The large Latin inscription on the façade reads: Clemens XII Pont Max Anno V Christo Salvatori In Hon SS Ioan Bapt et Evang. This abbreviated inscription translates as: "Pope Clement XII, in the fifth year [of his Pontificate, dedicated this building] to Christ the Savior, in honor of Saints John the Baptist and [John] the Evangelist". The inscription indicates, with its full title (see below), that the archbasilica was originally dedicated to Christ the Savior and, centuries later, co-dedicated to Saint John the Baptist and Saint John the Evangelist. Christ the Savior remains its primary dedication, and its titular feast day is 6 August, the Transfiguration of Christ. As the cathedral of the pope as bishop of Rome, it ranks superior to all other churches of the Catholic Church, including Saint Peter's Basilica.

Name

Lateran Palace

The archbasilica stands over the remains of the Castra Nova equitum singularium, the "New Fort of the Roman imperial cavalry bodyguards". The fort was established by Septimius Severus in AD 193. Following the victory of Emperor Constantine the Great over Maxentius (for whom the Equites singulares augusti, the emperor's mounted bodyguards had fought) at the Battle of the Milvian Bridge, the guard was abolished and the fort demolished. Substantial remains of the fort lie directly beneath the nave.

The remainder of the site was occupied during the early Roman Empire by the palace of the gens Laterani. Sextius Lateranus was the first plebeian to attain the rank of consul, and the Laterani served as administrators for several emperors.  One of the Laterani, Consul-designate Plautius Lateranus, became famous for being accused by Nero of conspiracy against the Emperor. The accusation resulted in the confiscation and redistribution of his properties.

The Lateran Palace fell into the hands of the Emperor when Constantine I married his second wife Fausta, sister of Maxentius.  Known by that time as the Domus Faustae or "House of Fausta", the Lateran Palace was eventually given to the Bishop of Rome by Constantine I. The actual date of the donation is unknown, but scholars speculate that it was during the pontificate of Pope Miltiades, in time to host a synod of bishops in 313 that was convened to challenge the Donatist schism, declaring Donatism to be heresy. The palace basilica was converted and extended, becoming the residence of Pope Sylvester I, eventually becoming the Cathedral of Rome, the seat of the Popes as the Bishops of Rome.

Early Church

Pope Sylvester I presided over the official dedication of the archbasilica and the adjacent Lateran Palace in 324, changing the name from Domus Fausta to Domus Dei ("House of God"), with a dedication to Christ the Savior (Christo Salvatori).

When a cathedra became a symbol of episcopal authority, the papal cathedra was placed in its interior, rendering it the cathedral of the Pope as Bishop of Rome.

When Gregory the Great sent the Gregorian mission to England under Augustine of Canterbury, some original churches in Canterbury took the Roman plan as a model, dedicating a church both to Christ as well as one to Saint Paul, outside the walls of the city. The church name "Christ Church", so common for churches around the world today in Anglophone Anglican contexts, originally came from this Roman church, central to pre-medieval Christian identity.

The Middle Ages

On the archbasilica's front wall between the main portals is a plaque inscribed with the words  ("Most Holy Lateran Church, mother and head of all the churches in the city and the world"); a visible indication of the declaration that the basilica is the "mother church" of all the world. In the twelfth century the canons of the Lateran claimed that the high altar housed the Ark of the Covenant and several holy objects from Jerusalem. The basilica was thus presented as the Temple of the New Covenant. 

The archbasilica and Lateran Palace were re-dedicated twice. Pope Sergius III dedicated them to Saint John the Baptist in the 10th century in honor of the newly consecrated baptistry of the archbasilica. Pope Lucius II dedicated them to John the Evangelist in the 12th century. Thus, Saint John the Baptist and Saint John the Evangelist became co-patrons of the archbasilica, while the primary Patron is still Christ the Savior, as the inscription in the entrance indicates and as is traditional for patriarchal cathedrals. Consequently, the archbasilica remains dedicated to the Savior, and its titular feast is the Feast of the Transfiguration of Christ on 6 August. The archbasilica became the most important shrine of the two Saint Johns, albeit infrequently jointly venerated. In later years, a Benedictine monastery was established in the Lateran Palace, and was devoted to serving the archbasilica and the two saints.

Every pope, beginning with Pope Miltiades, occupied the Lateran Palace until the reign of the French Pope Clement V, who in 1309 transferred the seat of the papacy to Avignon, a papal fiefdom that was an enclave in France. The Lateran Palace has also been the site of five ecumenical councils (see Lateran councils).

Lateran fires
During the time the papacy was seated in Avignon, France, the Lateran Palace and the archbasilica deteriorated. Two fires ravaged them in 1307 and 1361. After both fires the pope sent money from Avignon to pay for their reconstruction and maintenance. Nonetheless, the archbasilica and Lateran Palace lost their former splendor.

When the papacy returned from Avignon and the pope again resided in Rome, the archbasilica and the Lateran Palace were deemed inadequate considering their accumulated damage. The popes resided at the Basilica di Santa Maria in Trastevere and later at the Basilica di Santa Maria Maggiore. Eventually, the Palace of the Vatican was built adjacent to the Basilica of Saint Peter, which existed since the time of Emperor Constantine I, and the popes began to reside there. It has remained the official residence of the pope (though Pope Francis unofficially resides elsewhere in the Vatican City).

Reconstruction
There were several attempts at reconstruction of the archbasilica before a definitive program of Pope Sixtus V. Sixtus V hired his favorite architect, Domenico Fontana, to supervise much of the project. The original Lateran Palace was demolished and replaced with a new edifice. On the square in front of the Lateran Palace is San Giovanni Addolorata Hospital and the largest standing ancient Egyptian obelisk in the world, known as the Lateran Obelisk. It weighs an estimated 455 tons. It was commissioned by the Egyptian Pharaoh Thutmose III and erected by Thutmose IV before the great Karnak temple of Thebes, Egypt. Intended by Emperor Constantine I to be shipped to Constantinople, the very preoccupied Constantius II had it shipped instead to Rome, where it was erected in the Circus Maximus in AD 357. At some time it broke and was buried under the Circus. In the 16th century it was discovered and excavated, and Sixtus V had it re-erected on a new pedestal on 3 August 1588 at its present site.

Further renovation of the interior of the archbasilica, ensued under the direction of Francesco Borromini, commissioned by Pope Innocent X. The twelve niches created by his architectural scheme were eventually filled in 1718 with statues of the Apostles, sculpted by the most prominent Roman Rococo sculptors.

The vision of Pope Clement XII for reconstruction was an ambitious one in which he launched a competition to design a new façade. More than 23 architects competed, mostly working in the then-current Baroque idiom. The putatively impartial jury was chaired by Sebastiano Conca, president of the Roman Academy of Saint Luke. The winner of the competition was Alessandro Galilei.

The façade as it appears today was completed in 1735. It reads in Latin: Clemens XII Pont Max Anno V Christo Salvatori In Hon SS Ioan Bapt et Evang; this highly abbreviated inscription is expanded thus: Clemens XII, Pont[ifex] Max[imus], [in] Anno V, [dedicavit hoc aedificium] Christo Salvatori, in hon[orem] [sanctorum] Ioan[is] Bapt[tistae] et Evang[elistae]. This translates as "Pope Clement XII, Pontifex Maximus, in the fifth year of his reign, dedicated this building to Christ the Savior, in honor of Saints John the Baptist and John the Evangelist". Galilei's façade removed all vestiges of traditional, ancient, basilical architecture and imparted a neo-classical facade.

Architectural history

An apse lined with mosaics and open to the air still preserves the memory of one of the most famous halls of the ancient palace, the "Triclinium" of Pope Leo III, which was the state banqueting hall. The existing structure is not ancient, but some portions of the original mosaics may have been preserved in the tripartite mosaic of its niche. In the center Christ gives to the Apostles their mission; on the left he gives the keys of the kingdom of heaven to Pope Sylvester I and the Labarum to Emperor Constantine I; and on the right Peter gives the papal stole to Pope Leo III and the standard to Charlemagne.

Some few remains of the original buildings may still be traced in the city walls outside the Gate of Saint John, and a large wall decorated with paintings was uncovered in the 18th century within the archbasilica behind the Lancellotti Chapel. A few traces of older buildings were also revealed during the excavations of 1880, when the work of extending the apse was in progress, but nothing of importance was published.

A great many donations from the Popes and other benefactors to the archbasilica are recorded in the Liber Pontificalis, and its splendor at an early period was such that it became known as the "Basilica Aurea", or "Golden Basilica". This splendor drew upon it the attack of the Vandals, who stripped it of all its treasures. Pope Leo I restored it around AD 460, and it was again restored by Pope Hadrian.

In 897, it was almost totally destroyed by an earthquake: ab altari usque ad portas cecidit ("it collapsed from the altar to the doors"). The damage was so extensive that it was difficult to trace the lines of the old building, but these were mostly respected and the new building was of the same dimensions as the old. This second basilica stood for 400 years before it burned in 1308. It was rebuilt by Pope Clement V and Pope John XXII. It burned once more in 1360, and was rebuilt by Pope Urban V.

Through vicissitudes the archbasilica retained its ancient form, being divided by rows of columns into aisles, and having in front a peristyle surrounded by colonnades with a fountain in the middle, the conventional Late Antique format that was also followed by the old Saint Peter's Basilica. The façade had three windows and was embellished with a mosaic representing Christ as the Savior of the world.

The porticoes were frescoed, probably not earlier than the 12th century, commemorating the Roman fleet under Vespasian, the taking of Jerusalem, the Baptism of Emperor Constantine I and his "Donation" of the Papal States to the Catholic Church. Inside the archbasilica the columns no doubt ran, as in all other basilicas of the same date, the whole length of the church, from east to west.

In one of the rebuildings, probably that which was carried out by Pope Clement V, a transverse nave was introduced, imitated no doubt from the one which had been added, long before this, to the Basilica of Saint Paul Outside the Walls. Probably at this time the archbasilica was enlarged.

Some portions of the older buildings survive. Among them the pavement of medieval Cosmatesque work, and the statues of Saint Peter and Saint Paul, now in the cloister. The graceful ciborium over the high altar, which looks out of place in its present surroundings, dates from 1369. The stercoraria, or throne of red marble on which the Popes sat, is now in the Vatican Museums. It owes its unsavory name to the anthem sung at previous Papal coronations, "De stercore erigens pauperem" ("lifting up the poor out of the dunghill", from Psalm 112).

From the 5th century, there were seven oratories surrounding the archbasilica. These before long were incorporated into the church. The devotion of visiting these oratories, which was maintained through the Mediaeval Ages, gave rise to the similar devotion of the seven altars, still common in many churches of Rome and elsewhere.

Of the façade by Alessandro Galilei (1735), the cliché assessment  has ever been that it is the façade of a palace, not of a church. Galilei's front, which is a screen across the older front creating a narthex or vestibule, does express the nave and double aisles of the archbasilica, which required a central bay wider than the rest of the sequence. Galilei provided it, without abandoning the range of identical arch-headed openings, by extending the central window by flanking columns that support the arch, in the familiar Serlian motif.

By bringing the central bay forward very slightly, and capping it with a pediment that breaks into the roof balustrade, Galilei provided an entrance doorway on a more than colossal scale, framed in the paired colossal Corinthian pilasters that tie together the façade in the manner introduced at Michelangelo's palace on the Campidoglio.

In the narthex of the church, is a 4th-century statue of emperor Constantine. It was found elsewhere in Rome, and moved to this site by order of Pope Clement XII.

Statues of the Apostles
The twelve niches created in Francesco Borromini's architecture were left vacant for decades. When in 1702 Pope Clement XI and Benedetto Cardinal Pamphili, archpriests of the archbasilica, announced their grand scheme for twelve larger-than-life sculptures of the Apostles (Judas Iscariot replaced by Saint Paul, instead of Saint Matthias) to fill the niches, the commission was opened to all the premier sculptors of late Baroque Rome. Each statue was to be sponsored by an illustrious prince with the Pope himself sponsoring that of Saint Peter and Cardinal Pamphili that of Saint John the Evangelist.
Most of the sculptors were given a sketch drawn by Pope Clement's favorite painter, Carlo Maratta, to which they were to adhere, but with the notable exception being Pierre Le Gros the Younger, who successfully refused to sculpt to Maratta's design and consequently was not given a sketch.

The sculptors and their sculptures follow and are dated according to Conforti (the dates reflect archival findings but models for most must have existed before):

Pierre-Étienne Monnot
Saint Paul (1704–1708)
Saint Peter (1704–1711)
Francesco Moratti
Saint Simon (1704–1709)
Lorenzo Ottoni
Saint Jude Thaddeus (1704–1709)
Giuseppe Mazzuoli
Saint Philip (1705–1711)
Pierre Le Gros
Saint Thomas (1705–1711)
Saint Bartholomew (c. 1705–1712)
Angelo de' Rossi
Saint James the Lesser (1705–1711)
Camillo Rusconi
Saint Andrew (1705–1709)
Saint John (1705–1711)
Saint Matthew (1711–1715)
Saint James the Greater (1715–1718)

South wall

North wall

Papal tombs

There are six extant papal tombs inside the archbasilica: Alexander III (right aisles), Pope Sergius IV (right aisles), Pope Clement XII Corsini (left aisle), Pope Martin V (in front of the confessio); Pope Innocent III (right transept);  and Pope Leo XIII (left transept), by G. Tadolini (1907). The last of these, Pope Leo XIII, was the last pope not to be entombed in Saint Peter's Basilica, .

Twelve additional papal tombs were constructed in the archbasilica starting in the 10th century, but were destroyed during the two fires that ravaged it in 1308 and 1361. The remains of these charred tombs were gathered and reburied in a polyandrion. The popes whose tombs were destroyed are: Pope John X (914–928), Pope Agapetus II (946–955), Pope John XII (955–964), Pope Paschal II (1099–1118), Pope Callixtus II (1119–1124), Pope Honorius II (1124–1130), Pope Celestine II (1143–1144), Pope Lucius II (1144–1145), Pope Anastasius IV (1153–1154), Pope Clement III (1187–1191), Pope Celestine III (1191–1198), and Pope Innocent V (1276). Popes who reigned during this period, whose tombs are unknown, and who may have been buried in the archbasilica include Pope John XVII (1003), Pope John XVIII (1003–1009), and Pope Alexander II (1061–1073). Pope John X was the first pope buried within the walls of Rome, and was granted a prominent burial due to rumors that he was murdered by Theodora during a historical period known as the saeculum obscurum. Cardinals Vincenzo Santucci and Carlo Colonna are also buried in the archbasilica.

The skull of Saint Peter is also claimed to reside in the archbasilica since at least the ninth century, alongside the skull of Saint Paul.

Lateran baptistery

The octagonal Lateran baptistery stands somewhat apart from the archbasilica. It was founded by Pope Sixtus III, perhaps on an earlier structure, for a legend arose that Emperor Constantine I was baptized there and enriched the edifice. The baptistery was for many generations the only baptistery in Rome, and its octagonal structure, centered upon the large basin for full immersions, provided a model for others throughout Italy, and even an iconic motif of illuminated manuscripts known as "the fountain of life".

Lateran cloister
Between the archbasilica and the city wall there was in former times a great monastery, in which dwelt the community of monks whose duty it was to provide the services in the archbasilica. The only part of it which still survives is the 13th century cloister, surrounded by graceful, twisted columns of inlaid marble. They are of a style intermediate between the Romanesque proper and the Gothic, and are the work of Vassellectus and the Cosmati.

Holy Stairs

The Scala Sancta, or Holy Stairs, are white marble steps encased in wooden ones. They supposedly form the staircase which once led to the praetorium of Pontius Pilate in Jerusalem and which, therefore, were sanctified by the footsteps of Jesus Christ during His Passion. The marble stairs are visible through openings in the wooden risers. Their translation from Jerusalem to the Lateran Palace in the 4th century is credited to Saint Empress Helena, the mother of the then-Emperor Constantine I. In 1589, Pope Sixtus V relocated the steps to their present location in front of the ancient palatine chapel named the Sancta Sanctorum. Ferraù Fenzoni completed some of the frescoes on the walls.

Feast of the Dedication of the Archbasilica
The anniversary of the dedication of the church has been observed as a feast since the 12th century. In the General Roman Calendar of the Catholic Church, 9 November is the feast of the Dedication of the (Arch)Basilica of the Lateran (Dedicatio Basilicae Lateranensis), referred to in older texts as the "Dedication of the Basilica of the Most Holy Savior".

World War II
During the Second World War, the Lateran and its related buildings were used under Pope Pius XII as a safe haven from the Nazis and Italian Fascists for numbers of Jews and other refugees. Among those who found shelter there were Meuccio Ruini, Alcide De Gasperi, Pietro Nenni and others. The Daughters of Charity of Saint Vincent de Paul and the sixty orphan refugees they cared for were ordered to leave their convent on the Via Carlo Emanuele. The Sisters of Maria Bambina, who staffed the kitchen at the Pontifical Major Roman Seminary at the Lateran offered a wing of their convent. The grounds also housed Italian soldiers.

Vincenzo Fagiolo and Pietro Palazzini, vice-rector of the seminary, were recognized by Yad Vashem for their efforts to assist Jews.

Archpriests
Pope Boniface VIII instituted the office of Archpriest of the Archbasilica circa 1299.

List of Archpriests of the Archbasilica:

Gerardo Bianchi (c.1299–1302)
Pietro Valeriano Duraguerra (1302)
Matteo Rosso Orsini (1302–1305)
Pietro Colonna (1306–1326)
Bertrand de Montfavez (1326–1342)
Giovanni Colonna (1342–1348)
Pierre Roger de Beaufort (1348–1370)
Ange de Grimoard (1371–1388)
Pietro Tomacelli (1388?–1389)
Francesco Carbone (1389–1405)
Antonio Caetani (seniore) (1405–1412)
Oddone Colonna (1412–1417)
Alamanno Adimari (1418–1422)
Guillaume Fillastre (1422–1428)
Alfonso Carillo de Albornoz (1428–1434)
Lucido Conti (1434–1437)
Angelotto Fosco (1437–1444)
António Martinez de Chaves (1444–1447)
Domenico Capranica (1447–1458)
Prospero Colonna (1458–1463)
Latino Orsini (1463–1477)
Giuliano della Rovere (1477–1503)
Giovanni Colonna (1503–1538)
Alessandro Farnese (1508–1534)
Giovanni Domenico de Cupis (1534–1553)
Ranuccio Farnese (1553–1565)
Mark Sitticus von Hohenems (1565–1588)
Ascanio Colonna (1588–1608)
Scipione Caffarelli-Borghese (1608–1620)

Giambattista Leni (1620–1627)
Francesco Barberini (1627–1629)
Girolamo Colonna (1629–1666)
Flavio Chigi (1666–1693)
Paluzzo Paluzzi Altieri degli Albertoni (1693–1698)
Benedetto Pamphili (1699–1730)
Pietro Ottoboni (1730–1740)
Neri Maria Corsini (1740–1770)
Mario Marefoschi Compagnoni (1771–1780)
Carlo Rezzonico (1781–1799)
Francesco Saverio de Zelada (1800–1801)
Leonardo Antonelli (1801–1811)
Bartolomeo Pacca (1830–1844)
Benedetto Barberini (28 April 1844 – 10 April 1863)
Lodovico Altieri (1863–1867)
Costantino Patrizi Naro (1867–1876)
Flavio Chigi (24 December 1876 – 1885)
Raffaele Monaco La Valletta (1885–1896)
Francesco Satolli (16 December 1896 – 8 January 1910)
Pietro Respighi (10 January 1910 – 22 March 1913)
Domenico Ferrata (7 April 1913 – 10 October 1914)
Basilio Pompili (28 October 1914 – 5 May 1931)
Francesco Marchetti-Selvaggiani (26 May 1931 – 13 January 1951)
Benedetto Aloisi Masella (27 October 1954 – 30 August 1970)
Angelo Dell'Acqua (7 November 1970 – 27 August 1972)
Ugo Poletti (26 March 1973 – 17 January 1991)
Camillo Ruini (1 July 1991 – 27 June 2008)
Agostino Vallini (27 June 2008 – 26 May 2017)
Angelo De Donatis (26 May 2017 – )

Gallery

See also
Early Christian art and architecture
Colegio de San Juan de Letran, a Philippine school named after the archbasilica
Index of Vatican City-related articles
Schola Castra Nova Equitum Singularium

References

Notes

Citations

Sources

External links
 High-resolution virtual tour of Saint John Lateran, from the Vatican.
 Satellite Photo of Saint John Lateran
 Constantine's obelisk
 San Giovanni in Laterano
High-resolution 360° Panoramas and Images of Archbasilica of Saint John Lateran | Art Atlas
Interactive Nolli Map Website

John Lateran
Burial places of popes
Roman Catholic cathedrals in Italy
Extraterritorial properties of the Holy See in Rome
John Lateran
Baroque architecture in Rome
John Lateran
St John Lateran
Alessandro Galilei buildings